Miranda Gibson is an environmental activist and school teacher from Australia who is known for her tree sitting to save the rainforest in Southern Tasmania from logging. Her 449 days spent up the tree is the longest running tree sit in Australian history.

Biography 
On 14 December 2011, Gibson climbed up a  old-growth Eucalyptus delegatensis tree, dubbed the 'Observer Tree', in the heart of Tasmania's southern rainforest. Gibson vowed to stay until the forest in the Styx Valley was protected. The area was due to be logged by a Malaysian company, Ta Ann. After three months, her blog about the experienced had attracted over 50,000 views.

Gibson had a  platform built at the top of the tree, and was connected to a safety harness at all times. During the sit she experienced snow, hail and gale-force winds. She used a composting toilet, which she would lower down to her support crew on the ground, and slept under a tarp. A solar-powered computer and satellite technology enabled her to write a blog and attend  environmental conferences, school groups and festivals by video link. Gibson did not come down from the tree at any point during her sit, which broke the previous Australian record of 208 days, set in 1995. At the one year anniversary she was thanked by Nick Cave, John Butler, Blue King Brown, Bob Brown and Julia Butterfly Hill. Gibson had visitors on her platform during her tree sit, including her mother who stayed with her for four days.

Gibson came down from the tree in March 2013 after 449 days as a safety precaution due to a nearby bushfire. She voiced her disappointment in having to come down under those circumstances, though said she was proud of her achievement and vowed to keep fighting for Tasmania's forests. Gibson said she was thrilled with the decision; she had been contemplating returning to the tree if the World Heritage space had not been extended.

References 

1982 births
Living people
Australian environmentalists
Australian women environmentalists
Australian women in politics
Australian schoolteachers
Environmental protests in Australia